Abu Mayeen Ashfakus Samad (9 January 1949–20 November 1971) was an officer of the Bangladesh Army from its first Batch. He was killed in the Bangladesh Liberation War and was awarded the second highest gallantry award of Bangladesh, Bir Uttam.

Early life
Samad was born in Faridpur, East Pakistan, Pakistan, on 9 January 1949. He graduated from St Joseph School and then finished his HSC from Notre Dame College. He was admitted in the University of Dhaka, Department of Statistics.

Career
On 25 March 1971, the Pakistan Army launched Operation Searchlight and the Bangladesh Liberation war started, On 29 March 1971, Samad moved to Kishoreganj with a few friends. There they trained under the 2 East Bengal Regiment and 4 East Bengal Regiment. After training they moved back to Dhaka. He received further training in Agartala, India. He fought under the 2 East Bengal Regiment, Saldanadi Sub-sector. On 9 October 1971, he was commissioned in the first batch of Bangladesh Army. He was posted in Shahebganj Sub-sector of Sector 6. He fought a number of battles and liberated Bhurungamari.

Death and legacy
The Mukti Bahini launched an attack on Raiganj base of Pakistan Army. After Pakistan army launched a counterattack, Samad provided cover fire so the Mukti Bahini soldiers could escape. He was killed in action that day. He was buried in the graveyard near Jaimonirhat Bazar with full military honors. Jaimonirhat was renamed Samad Nagar. He was awarded Bir Uttam by the government of Bangladesh. A road in Dhaka has been renamed Bir Uttam Ashfakus Samad Sarak after him. On 27 March 2015, the Sixty-six Infantry Division of Bangladesh Army erected a monument dedicated to Samad in Rangpur Cantonment.

References

1949 births
1971 deaths
People killed in the Bangladesh Liberation War
University of Dhaka alumni
People from Faridpur District
Bangladesh Army officers
Mukti Bahini personnel
Recipients of the Bir Uttom
Notre Dame College, Dhaka alumni